NGC 4150 is an elliptical galaxy located approximately 45 million light years away in the constellation Coma Berenices. It was discovered by William Herschel on March 13, 1785.

See also
 List of NGC objects (4001–5000)

Gallery

References

External links
 

Elliptical galaxies
Coma Berenices
4150
038742